Hřiměždice is a municipality and village in Příbram District in the Central Bohemian Region of the Czech Republic. It has about 400 inhabitants. It lies on the shore of Slapy Reservoir.

Administrative parts
Villages of Háje and Vestec are administrative parts of Hřiměždice.

Geography
It lies in the Benešov Uplands. The municipality is situated on the shore of the Slapy Reservoir.

History
The first written mention of Hřiměždice is from 1270. Until 1270, the village was owned by the Břevnov Monastery, then King Ottokar II of Bohemia merged it with the Kamýk estate. In the 15th and 16th centuries, Hřiměždice belonged to the Hluboká estate. Jan Vojkovský of Milhostice bought Hřiměždice in 1569 and annexed it to the Zduchovice estate. During the 17th century, the Wratislaw of Mitrovice family and the Strahov Monastery were among the owners of the estate. At the beginning of the 18th century, knight Adam of Mateřov bought Hřimeždice from the monastery and made it the centre of his small estate.

Sport
Hřiměždice is known for a flooded quarry after granite mining, which is used for recreation and where an extreme water jumping competition called High Jump is held every year.

Sights
The landmarks of Hřiměždice are the castle and the church. The Church of Saint Anne was originally a chapel from around 1700, which was extended into the church in 1797. It is a simple late Baroque building.

The Hřiměždice Castle was first documented in 1788. It is a small one-story castle in the Baroque and Neoclassical styles. The castle used to have a tower, which was removed during the reconstruction in 1945.

References

External links

Villages in Příbram District